Kelso Township is an inactive township in Scott County, in the U.S. state of Missouri.

Kelso Township was erected in 1822, taking its name from I. R. Kelso, a pioneer citizen.

References

Townships in Missouri
Townships in Scott County, Missouri